Ctenopharynx nitidus is a species of fish in the family Cichlidae. It is endemic to Lake Malawi.

References

nitidus
Taxa named by Ethelwynn Trewavas
Fish described in 1935
Taxonomy articles created by Polbot